Khenziri (also Romanized as Khenẕīrī and Khān Ziri; also known as Khenfīrī) is a village in Soveyseh Rural District, in the Soveyseh District of Karun County, Khuzestan Province, Iran. At the 2006 census, its population was 116, in 15 families.

References 

Populated places in Karun County